Alexandre Raineau (born 21 June 1986) is a French professional footballer who plays as a midfielder.

Career
Raineau began playing youth football with INF Clairefontaine before joining Stade Malherbe Caen for senior football. He spent ten seasons playing as a defensive midfielder, and later as a left-back, for Stade Malherbe Caen. He appeared in 137 competitive matches for the club, helping Caen achieve promotion to Ligue 1 on several occasions, including winning the 2010 Ligue 2 title.

References

External links
 
 

1986 births
Living people
Footballers from Paris
Association football midfielders
French footballers
INF Clairefontaine players
Stade Malherbe Caen players
FC Libourne players
LB Châteauroux players
Ligue 1 players
Ligue 2 players
Championnat National players
Championnat National 2 players
Championnat National 3 players